Halvans (also Romanized as Ḩalvāns, Halvāns, and Helwān; also known as Havānleh and Hilwān) is a village in Zhavarud-e Sharqi Rural District, in the Central District of Sanandaj County, Kurdistan Province, Iran. At the 2006 census, its population was 429, in 106 families. The village is populated by Kurds.

References 

Towns and villages in Sanandaj County
Kurdish settlements in Kurdistan Province